David Williams (also Dash) is a fictional character from the ABC television series Desperate Housewives, portrayed by Neal McDonough and created by Marc Cherry. The character was introduced in the fifth season as Edie Britt's (Nicollette Sheridan) motivational speaker husband, and is the mystery star for the fifth season.

Development and casting
Neal McDonough's casting as Dave Williams was announced in July 2008. McDonough did not audition for the role, but was offered it after meeting with Marc Cherry. The series creator wanted McDonough to portray Dave after he saw the actor playing the role of David McNorris, an alcoholic  County Asst. D.A. in NBC's short-lived crime drama Boomtown, and thus wanted to see the dark side of David McNorris "infused in the dark side of David Williams". McDonough described his character as "this really sweet guy next door and then something tragic happens to him and his personality splits in half. You like Dave and you feel for him, but he also creeps the hell out of you."

Half-way through the season, just after the death of Nicollette Sheridan's character Edie Britt was filmed, McDonough already knew that his character would last just one season, and though he hinted that Dave might return for a brief arc in subsequent seasons, this never happened.

History

Season 5
Dave convinces Edie to move back to Wisteria Lane and get her house back from her tenant. After paying the tenant to leave the house, Dave and Edie moved in. Edie announces to the women that she is married and introduces Dave.

Outwardly, Dave seems refined and affable, but his darkness is quickly established: in a phone conversation with his psychiatrist, Dr. Samuel Heller, he says his rage is still with him, but there is one unnamed person who needs to worry about it. Karen McCluskey immediately clashes with Dave after she insults Edie, resulting in her cat Toby's disappearance. Toby reappears only after Karen apologizes to Edie. Karen becomes suspicious and investigates Dave. His response is to immediately plant the seed that Karen is old and senile, and causing her a breakdown during her 70th birthday party, which results in Karen being taken to the hospital. Meanwhile, he has purchased another house in the neighborhood so that he could rent it at a reasonable rate to Mike Delfino - who has been living across town since his divorce - and started a band with Mike, Tom Scavo, Orson Hodge, and Carlos Solis. Karen reassumes investigation once she is released from the hospital with the help of her sister, and learns of Dave's regular contact with Dr. Heller. They reveal to him that Dave is in Fairview, and Dr. Heller immediately travels to Wisteria Lane to confront him. Dave strangles him in the storage room of the White Horse Club, where his band has entered a Battle of the Bands competition. He then sets a fire that will burn slowly so that he will be onstage when it reaches the crowd, in order to cover up the murder. Mike is knocked unconscious, and Dave re-enters the burning building to save him and is hailed a hero.

Dave begins to see vivid hallucinations of his wife Lila Dash and their daughter, Paige - the people killed in the crash that broke up Mike and Susan Delfino's marriage, and tells them he will make Mike pay. One night, Edie finds Dave in conversation with his hallucinations, and Dave reveals that he is a widower and struggles with the memory of his wife, and she kicks him out of the house for lying to her. A flashback reveals that Dave married Edie after learning she once lived on Wisteria Lane and never sold the house. Later, Edie decides she does not want to be alone and takes him back. Dave then plans a camping trip with Mike and his girlfriend Katherine Mayfair and tricks Edie into staying home. An encounter with a priest in a liquor store arouses Edie's suspicions, and she hears the name David Dash for the first time. She begins researching Dave's past, learning that it was not only his wife who died in the crash, but also the daughter he had failed to mention, and later discovers that Mike was the driver of the other car. Dave, Mike and Katherine leave for their trip, in which Dave tries to shoot Katherine with a hunting rifle to get revenge on Mike, but Edie texts him just as he pulls the trigger, distracting him and moving his aim. Dave returns home to a confrontation with Edie, who tells him she intends to warn Mike. Dave strangles Edie until she falls to the floor but stops before he kills her. Frightened, Edie flees their home, but is electrocuted after a car accident and dies.

Susan checks in on Dave after Edie's death. Still unaware of Dave's true identity, she confides that she was driving the car the night of the crash but that Mike took responsibility because she had left her license in a different handbag. Dave turns his rage to Susan and determines to kill Mike and Susan's son M.J. Delfino in revenge for Susan's killing his wife and daughter. He plans a fishing trip with Susan and M.J. and records a video for Mike, stating that he did not want to kill M.J. but that he had to. Mike accidentally watches the tape before his honeymoon, and phones Susan and reveals Dave's true identity. Meanwhile, the police have since identified the body of Dr. Heller and put all the pieces together. Dave arranges to meet Mike at the intersection where the accident in which his family was killed, so that Mike can hit Dave's car with M.J. and Dave himself inside. However, Dave changes his mind in the last minute after he hallucinates that it is his daughter in the backseat, and tells M.J. to get out of the car.

Dave awakens, and the camera zooms in on his face, as he imagines saving his family by telling them to stay home. As the camera zooms out again, Dave is seen in a secure room at Boston Ridgegate Mental Facility.

Reception
The character of Dave Williams received mixed reviews. Matt Roush of TV Guide described Neal McDonough as "smoothly sinister" and his character as "mysterious and manipulative". Ken Tucker of Entertainment Weekly praised the casting of McDonough, stating that his "ice-blue eyes always look cyborg-ish — perfectly apt for his character". While reviewing the Red Hot Edition of the fifth season's DVD, Aaron Wallace from DVDizzy called the writers "storytelling savants", noting that revealing pieces of the truth helped to head off "the frustration that an ungratified audience can feel when questions abound but answers elude". In a review of the fifth season premiere, Tanner Stransky of Entertainment Weekly described McDonough as "always-creepy" and noted the power Dave holds over Edie.

Stransky later reviewed the season finale and opined that Dave's plan was all about making Susan suffer, but himself too, as he felt responsible for letting his wife and daughter to go out the night they died. According to Stransky, this twist made "this somewhat bloated and too-long-gestating storyline more layered and dynamic."

References

Desperate Housewives characters
Television characters introduced in 2008
Fictional murderers
Fictional characters with neurological or psychological disorders